Trygve Aasen (10 November 1900 – 16 July 1938) was a Norwegian footballer. He played in four matches for the Norway national football team from 1926 to 1927.

References

External links
 

1900 births
1938 deaths
Norwegian footballers
Norway international footballers
Association football defenders
Moss FK players